Ozun Darreh or Ozundarreh or Owzun Darreh or Uzon Darreh or Uzondarreh or Oozoon Darreh or Owzown Darreh or Uzun Darreh may refer to:
 Ozun Darreh, Fars
 Ozundarreh, Hamadan
 Owzun Darreh, Qazvin
 Uzun Darreh-ye Olya, West Azerbaijan Province
 Uzun Darreh-ye Sofla, West Azerbaijan Province